The Men's 69 kg weightlifting event at the 2002 Commonwealth Games took place at the Manchester International Convention Centre on 31 July 2002.

Schedule
All times are Coordinated Universal Time (UTC)

Records
Prior to this competition, the existing world, Commonwealth and Games records were as follows:

The following records were established during the competition:

Results

References

Weightlifting at the 2002 Commonwealth Games